Loch Gruinart ( from the Old Norse, meaning "shallow fjord") is a sea loch on the northern coast of isle of Islay in Scotland. Land at the head of the loch, Gruinart Flats, is a designated nature reserve owned by the RSPB. It is an important winter roosting site for barnacle geese. Ardnave Point is a coastal promontory near the mouth of the loch on the northwest of Islay.

The Battle of Traigh Ghruinneart was fought on the sands at the south end of the loch on 5 August 1598 between a force from Mull led by Sir Lachlan Mor MacLean of Duart and the Islay men led by Sir James MacDonald, 9th of Dunnyveg, son of Angus MacDonald of Dunyvaig and the Glens, in which Macleans were defeated and all killed, including Sir Lachlan, save one who survived by swimming to Nave Island.

The pìobaireachd Lament for Sir Lachlan Mor harks back to this battle which was also remembered in Islay folklore.

References

External links

link

Landforms of Islay
Gruinart
Royal Society for the Protection of Birds reserves in Scotland
Protected areas of Argyll and Bute
Gruinart